The 1968–69 Purdue Boilermakers men's basketball team represented Purdue University during the 1968–69 NCAA men's college basketball season.

Roster

Schedule and results

|-
!colspan=9 style=|Non-conference regular season

|-
!colspan=9 style=|Big Ten regular season

|-
!colspan=9 style=|NCAA Tournament

Awards and honors

Highest scoring team in the nation

Rick Mount—1st Team All-America

Rick Mount—Big Ten Conference Player of the year

Team players drafted into the NBA

References

Purdue Boilermarkers
Purdue Boilermakers men's basketball seasons
Purdue
NCAA Division I men's basketball tournament Final Four seasons